Coldness is the second album by power metal band Kotipelto, released in 2004 while Stratovarius was in hiatus.

Track listing 
All music and lyrics written by Timo Kotipelto.

 "Seeds of Sorrow" – 4:09
 "Reasons" – 3:46
 "Around" – 5:24
 "Can You Hear the Sound" – 3:19
 "Snowbound" – 4:34
 "Journey Back" – 3:37
 "Evening's Fall" – 3:56
 "Coldness of My Mind" – 3:34
 "Take Me Away" – 3:31
 "Here We Are" – 6:22
 "Beyond Dreams" – 3:36 (Japanese edition bonus track)

Personnel 
 Timo Kotipelto – lead vocals
 Michael Romeo – guitars on tracks 1, 2, 3, 4, 6, 7, 8
 Juhani Malmberg – guitars on tracks 5, 9, 10
 Jari Kainulainen – bass
 Janne Wirman – keyboards
 Mirka Rantanen – drums

Additional personnel
 Antti Wirman – lead guitar on tracks 9, 10

References 

2004 albums
Kotipelto albums
Century Media Records albums